The 1934 Thrace pogroms ("Thrace incidents" or "Thrace events", Ladino: Furtuna/La Furtuna, "Storm") refers to a series of violent attacks against Jewish citizens of Turkey in June and July 1934 in the Thrace region of Turkey. One of the main crucial factors behind the events was the Resettlement Law passed by the Turkish Assembly on 14 June 1934.

Background 

Some have argued that the acts were initiated by the articles which were written by Pan-Turkist ideologists like Cevat Rıfat Atilhan and Faik Kurdoğlu in Millî İnkılâp  (National Revolution) magazine and Nihal Atsız in Orhun magazine. One researcher accepted Atilhan's role, but he argued that Atsız did not participate in such an act, because Orhun only contained two articles about Jews, and both of them were published after Atsız resettled in İstanbul. Then the Resettlement Law was meant to enable demographic engineering in favor of a potentially Turkish speaking majority and the campaign Citizens speak Turkish!, which meant to force the people to speak Turkish, was supported by the Turkish Peoples Houses. On the 5 July after having become aware of the potential repercussions, the chairman of the Peoples House in Izmir denied the campaign was directed at Jews and claimed it was only against foreign languages, including Greek, Spanish and Albanian.

Pogrom 

The incidents which preceded the pogrom started in Çanakkale in the second half of June 1934. The pogroms occurred in Tekirdağ, Edirne, Kırklareli, and Çanakkale, and they were motivated by anti-Semitism. 

They were followed by acts of vandalism against Jewish houses and shops. The tensions started in June 1934 and they spread to a few other villages in the Eastern Thrace region and some small cities in the Western Aegean region. At the height of the violent events, it was rumored that a rabbi was stripped naked and shamefully dragged through the streets and his daughter was raped.

The government of Mustafa Kemal failed to stop the pogrom. In the context of the 1934 Turkish Resettlement Law, foreign diplomats who were based in Turkey at that time believed that the Turkish government implicitly supported the Thrace pogrom in order to facilitate the relocation of Turkey's Jewish population. After the foreign press reported about the pogroms, Prime Minister Ismet Inönü acknowledged their existence, condemned them and blamed them to Anti-semitism. Haaretz reports that according to the historian Corry Guttstadt, "the Turkish authorities had apparently opted for the strategy of putting the Jews under such pressure with boycott activities and anonymous threats 'from the population' that they would leave the area 'voluntarily.'" Further, according to historian Rifat Bali that the incitement against Jews was common in the press at the time and this contributed to the violence.

Aftermath 

Over 15,000 Jewish citizens of Turkey had to flee from the region.

See also
Antisemitism in Turkey
Racism in Turkey

References

Further reading

 

 

 

1934 in Europe
1934 in Turkey
1934 riots
June 1934 events
July 1934 events
Anti-Jewish pogroms by Muslims
Antisemitism in Turkey
History of Çanakkale
History of Edirne
History of Kırklareli
History of Tekirdağ
Modern history of Thrace
1934 in Judaism
Eastern Thrace
1934 crimes in Turkey